Black Friday is a mixtape by rapper Tony Yayo hosted by G-Unit's DJ Whoo Kid. The mixtape features exclusive tracks from Tony Yayo with appearances by Uncle Murda, Spider Loc, 50 Cent, Trav, 40 Glocc and Stack Bundles. It was released for digital download on September 30, 2008 on datpiff.

Track list

2008 mixtape albums
Tony Yayo albums